David Addo (born 9 February 1983) is a Ghanaian football player who currently plays for Liberty Professionals FC.

Career 
In winter 2005 Addo moved from Zaytuna F.C. to Liberty Professionals FC on a free transfer.

References
 Liberty Professionals  »  David Addo
 Article citing Addo played for Liberty in the Confederations Cup

1983 births
Living people
Ghanaian footballers
Association football defenders
Liberty Professionals F.C. players
Zaytuna F.C. players